Iksaka Banu (born in Yogyakarta, Indonesia on October 7, 1964) is an Indonesian writer of comics and prose. His work has featured in a variety of Indonesian mass media. In 2008 and 2009 he won Pena Kencana Awards and in 2014 he was a recipient of a Khatulistiwa Literary Award for a collection of short stories titled "Semua Untuk Hindia".

References

1964 births
Indonesian writers
Living people